The 1946 United States Senate election in Michigan was held on November 5, 1946.

Republican Senator Arthur Vandenberg was re-elected to a fourth consecutive term in a landslide over Democrat James H. Lee.

General election

Candidates
Hugo Beiswenger (Communist)
Theos A. Grove (Socialist Labor)
James H. Lee, candidate for U.S. Representative in 1920 (Democratic)
Lawrence A. Ruble (Prohibition)
Arthur Vandenberg, incumbent Senator since 1928 (Republican)

Results

See also 
 1946 United States Senate elections

References 

1946
Michigan
United States Senate